Malca Gillson (1926-2010) was a Canadian filmmaker with the National Film Board of Canada, and one of the first women to join the NFB in a non-junior position. She was a multi-tasker, acting as composer, sound editor, editor, producer and director. She is best known for her ground-breaking trilogy about end-of-life care: The Last Days of Living, Reflections on Suffering and Time for Caring.

Early life
Gillson was born Malca Laskin in Yorkton, Saskatchewan, to Bures T. Laskin and Florence Natonson. Hers was a prominent family; her father was a four-term mayor of Humboldt, Saskatchewan; her uncle Saul Laskin became the first mayor of Thunder Bay; her other paternal uncle, Bora Laskin, became the 14th Chief Justice of Canada.

Career
Gillson joined the NFB in 1955, by which time she was married to NFB cameraman Denis Gillson; they would divorce, but she kept the name for the rest of her life. At the time, most female recruits were negative cutters and secretaries; she was hired as a composer, then placed in the sound department and went on to do the sound and/or music for several notable films, including the BAFTA-winning Buster Keaton Rides Again (1965), and Oscar nominee Helicopter Canada (1966).
 
By 1971, Gillson was a film editor and, in 1975, she began to direct. Her films, including Musicanada (1975), Alberta Girls (1975) and Canada Vignettes: The Music Makers (1975) all involved music and musicians. In 1979, her attention turned to end-of-life issues and she filmed three documentaries at Montreal’s Royal Victoria Hospital: The Last Days of Living (1980), Reflections on Suffering (1982) and Time for Caring (1982). The Last Days of Living, shot at the hospital’s palliative care unit, was the first film to truthfully bring the subject of death to professionals and the public; it is regarded as an essential film for healthcare professionals, volunteers and the public at large.

Gillson retired from the NFB in 1980 and died in Toronto in 2010.

Filmography
Eye Witness No. 88 - documentary short, Grant Crabtree and Hector Lemieux 1955 - music
Lobsters Are a Community Affair - documentary short, Donald Fraser 1955 - music
Eye Witness No. 98 - documentary short, Tim Wilson and Hector Lemieux 1957 - sound editor
Bridge Under the Ocean - documentary short, Raymond Garceau 1957 - sound editor 
Wildlife of the Rocky Mountains - documentary short, William H. Carrick 1958 - music editor
Security: Espionage - documentary short, Stanley Clish 1958 - co-sound editor with Victor Merrill
The Responsibilities of Freedom - documentary short, Ian MacNeill 1958 - sound editor
Setting Fires for Science - documentary short, Donald Brittain 1958 - co-sound editor with Karl Duplessis
Stigma - short film, Stanley Jackson 1958 - sound editor
Trans Canada Summer - documentary, Ronald Dick 1958 - music editor
The Clerk - short film, Allan Wargon 1958 - co-sound editor with Kathleen Shannon
The Department Manager - short film, Hugh O’Connor 1958 - co-sound editor with David Green
The General Foreman - short film, Morten Parker 1958 - sound editor
The Skilled Worker - short film, Morten Parker 1958 - music, co-sound editor with David Green
New Nation in the West Indies - Background to Federation - documentary short, Ian MacNeill 1958 - sound editor
New Nation in the West Indies - The Riches of the Indies - documentary short, Ian MacNeill 1958 - sound editor
Fire Detectives - documentary short, Donald Brittain 1958 - music
Here and There - The St. Lawrence Seaway: Lifeline - documentary short, John Howe 1958 - music
Here and There - The St. Lawrence Seaway: Power - documentary short, John Howe 1958 - music
Here and There - The St. Lawrence Seaway: Bottleneck - documentary short, John Howe 1958 - music
Le maître du Pérou - documentary, Fernand Dansereau 1958 - co-sound editor with Bernard Bordeleau
Weakness into Strength - documentary short, Ian MacNeill 1958 - sound editor
L'immigré - short film, Bernard Devlin 1959 - sound editor with Bernard Bordeleau
The Golden Age - documentary short, Richard Gilbert 1959 - music
The St. Lawrence Seaway - documentary short, John Howe and Isobel Kehoe 1959 - with Maurice Blackburn, music
In the Beginning a Wilderness of Air - documentary short, Richard Gilbert 1959 - music
The Maritimes: Traditions and Transitions - documentary short, Morten Parker 1959 - sound editor
Double Heritage - documentary short, Richard Gilbert 1959 - music
John Lyman, peintre - documentary short, Fernand Dansereau 1959 - sound editor with Marguerite Payette
The Good, Bright Days (1919-1927) - documentary short, William Weintraub 1960 - with Eldon Rathburn and Joan Edward, music
Sunshine and Eclipse (1927-1934) - documentary short, William Weintraub 1960 - with Eldon Rathburn and Joan Edward, music
Twilight of an Era (1934-1939) - documentary short, William Weintraub 1960 - with Eldon Rathburn and Joan Edward, music
Leadership Discipline - You Have Control - training film, Donald Wilder 1960 - music
Search and Rescue: The Rescue Coordination Centre - documentary short, Roger Blais 1960 - music
Search and Rescue: The Searchmaster - documentary short, Roger Blais 1960 - music
Suburban Living: Six Solutions - documentary, Richard Gilbert 1960 - co-sound editor with Pierre Lemelin
Le sport et les hommes - documentary, Hubert Aquin 1961 - sound editor 
Joey - short film, Graham Parker 1964 - co-sound editor with Victor Merrill
The Prison Community - documentary short, Ernest Reid 1965 - music
Buster Keaton Rides Again - documentary, John Spotton 1965 - music
Notes for a Film About Donna & Gail - short film, Don Owen 1966 - music editor
The Animal Movie - cartoon, Grant Munro and Ron Tunis 1966 - music and sound 
Helicopter Canada - documentary, Eugene Boyko 1966 - music
Take It from the Top - documentary short, Eugene Boyko 1966 - music
At the Autumn River Camp - documentary, Quentin Brown 1967 - co-sound editor with Ken Page and Don Wellington 
At the Caribou Crossing Place - documentary, Quentin Brown 1967 - co-sound editor with Ken Page and Don Wellington 
At the Spring Sea Ice Camp - documentary, Quentin Brown 1967 - co-sound editor with Ken Page and Don Wellington 
At the Winter Sea Ice Camp - documentary, Quentin Brown 1967 - co-sound editor with Ken Page and Don Wellington 
Fishing at the Stone Weir - documentary, Quentin Brown 1967 - co-sound editor with Ken Page and Don Wellington 
Stalking Seal on the Spring Ice - documentary, Quentin Brown 1967 - co-sound editor with Ken Page and Don Wellington 
Jigging for Lake Trout - documentary short, Quentin Brown 1967 - co-sound editor with Ken Page and Don Wellington 
Group Hunting on the Spring Ice - documentary, Quentin Brown 1967 - co-sound editor with Ken Page and Don Wellington 
Building a Kayak - documentary, Quentin Brown 1967 - co-sound editor with Ken Page and Don Wellington 
The Ernie Game - feature, Don Owen 1967 - music editor
Angel - experimental short, Derek May 1967 - sound editor
Adventures - short film, Michael Rubbo 1968 - co-sound editor with Victor Merrill 
The Winds of Fogo - documentary short, Colin Low 1969 - sound editor
Falling from Ladders - documentary short, Mort Ransen 1969 - sound editor
Where There's Smoke - compilation, Robert Verrall 1970 - co-editor with Karl Duplessis and Alex Raymont
The Eskimo: Fight for Life - documentary, Robert M. Young 1970 - co-sound editor with Ken Page and Don Wellington 
Girls of Mountain Street - documentary short, Susan Huycke 1970 - sound editor
Here's to Harry's Grandfather - documentary, Michael Rubbo 1970 - sound editor
Pillar of Wisdom - documentary short, Josef Reeve 1970 - co-sound editor with Roger Lamoureux, Bill Graziadei and Roger Hart
Of Many People - documentary short, Stanley Jackson 1970 - co-editor with John Spotton and Colin Low
Ashes of Doom - short film, Grant Munro and Don Arioli 1970 - co-sound editor with Victor Merrill
People of the Seal: Eskimo Summer - documentary, Richard Robinson and Michael McKennirey 1971 - co-sound editor with Ken Page, André Galbrand and Don Wellington 
People of the Seal: Eskimo Winter - documentary, Richard Robinson and Michael McKennirey 1971 - co-sound editor with Ken Page, André Galbrand and Don Wellington 
Nell and Fred - documentary short, Richard Todd 1971 - editor
Norman Jewison, Film maker - documentary, Douglas Jackson 1971 - co-editor with Edward Le Lorrain and Les Halman
Summer's Nearly Over - documentary short, Michael Rubbo 1971 - co-sound editor with Bill Graziadei
Here is Canada - documentary short, Tony Ianzelo 1972 - editor
The Question of Television Violence - documentary, Graeme Ferguson 1972 - editor
Sub-Igloo - documentary short, James de Beaujeu Domville and Joseph B. MacInnis 1973 - editor
Bate's Car: Sweet as a Nut - documentary short, Tony Ianzelo 1974 - editor
Musicanada - documentary, 1975 - editor, co-director with Tony Ianzelo
Alberta Girls - documentary short, 1975 - editor, co-director with Tony Ianzelo
The Great Clean-up - documentary, James Carney 1976 - music with Karl Duplessis
The Wings of Time - documentary short, Tom Radford 1976 - sound editor
Coaches - documentary, Paul Cowan 1976 - sound editor
You’re Eating for Two - documentary short, 1977 - editor, director
The Forests and Vladimir Krajina - documentary short, Tom Radford 1978 - co-sound editor with Ian Rankin and Anne Wheeler
The War is Over - short film, René Bonnière 1978 - producer
It Wasn’t Easy - documentary short, Nico Crama 1978 - co-editor with Steven Kellar
Canada Vignettes: The Music Makers - documentary short, 1979 - editor, director
A Pinto for the Prince - documentary short, Colin Low and John Spotton 1979 - sound editor
Fixed in Time: A Victoria Album - documentary short, Shelagh Mackenzie 1980 - co-sound editor with Les Halman and Arthur McKay
The Last Days of Living - documentary, 1980 - editor, director
Reflections on Suffering - documentary short, 1982 - editor, director
Time for Caring - documentary short, 1982 - editor, director
Singing: A Joy in Any Language - documentary, 1983 - editor, co-director with Tony Ianzelo
Musical Magic: Gilbert and Sullivan in Stratford - documentary, 1984 - editor, director
The Road to Patriation - documentary, Robert Duncan 1984 - co-editor with Fred Hillier, co-producer with Robert Duncan, Jennifer Torrance and Tom Daly
One Step Away - documentary short, Robert Fortier 1985 - casting director 
Automated Lovers - documentary short, Annie O'Donoghue 1986 - sound editor 
Making the Words Sing - documentary short, 1990 - co-editor with Rex Tasker, co-producer with Terry Fulmer, director

Awards

Musicanada (1975)
 Golden Gate International Film Festival, San Francisco: Honorable Mention, Special Jury Award, 1976

The Last Days of Living (1980)
 Chicago International Film Festival, Chicago: Gold Plaque, Social Issues, 1980 
 Golden Gate International Film Festival, San Francisco: Honorable Mention, Honorable Mention, 1980
 HEMA (Health Education Media Association) Film Festival, Philadelphia: Best of Show, 1981
 Columbus International Film & Animation Festival, Columbus, Ohio: Chris Award, Bronze Plaque, 1981
 Medikinale, Marburg: Gold Medal, Specialized Information Films, 1982
 Medikinale, Marburg: Gold Medal, Grand Prize of the University of Marburg, 1982

Time for Caring (1982) 
 International Rehabilitation Film Festival, New York: Certificate of Merit, 1983

References

1926 births
2010 deaths
Film directors from Saskatchewan
Film producers from Saskatchewan
National Film Board of Canada people
Canadian documentary film directors
Films about death
Canadian women film directors
Canadian women documentary filmmakers
People from Yorkton
Canadian documentary film producers
Canadian women film producers